Nguyen Gia Tri or Nguyễn Gia Trí (Chương Mỹ, Hà Tây 1908 - 1993) was a Vietnamese painter best known for his lacquer paintings.
He also drew cartoons on political and social issues, many of them criticising French colonial rule.

Tri studied at the Hanoi College of Fine Arts (École des Beaux-Arts de l’Indochine) from 1932.
He worked for the magazines Phong Hóa and Ngày Nay starting from 1932 together with Nhất Linh and other famous writers and painters. He created the cartoon characters Xã Xệ and Bang Bạnh for the magazines and made changes to the character Lý Toét developed by Nhất Linh.

Works
Many of his works are in the Vietnam National Museum of Fine Arts, Hanoi.

References

1908 births
1993 deaths
20th-century Vietnamese painters